The 2010–11 Nevada Wolf Pack men's basketball team represented the University of Nevada, Reno during the 2010–11 NCAA Division I men's basketball season. The Wolf Pack, led by second year head coach David Carter, played their home games at the Lawlor Events Center and were members of the Western Athletic Conference. They finished the season 13–18, 8–8 in WAC play. They lost to New Mexico State in the semifinals of the WAC Basketball tournament.

Roster

Schedule

|-
!colspan=9| Exhibition

|-
!colspan=9| Regular season

|-
!colspan=9| WAC tournament

References

Nevada Wolf Pack men's basketball seasons
Nevada
Nevada Wolf Pack
Nevada Wolf Pack